Zirka Stadium is a multifunctional facility, primarily used for football located in Kropyvnytskyi, Ukraine. The stadium is the biggest one in Kirovohrad Oblast. 

Currently the professional football club FC Zirka Kropyvnytskyi plays their home games at the stadium. The stadium has a capacity of 14,628.

Football usage

Some other clubs of Kropyvnytskyi (Kirovohrad) also used this facility among which are Olimpik Kirovohrad, Nova Politsiya Kropyvnytskyi and others.

References

External links
 How comfortable is to attend the UPL games: Zirka Stadium (Наскільки комфортно ходити на матчі УПЛ: стадіон "Зірка"). Football 24. 5 April 2018

Football venues in Ukraine
Buildings and structures in Kirovohrad Oblast
Sport in Kropyvnytskyi
FC Zirka Kropyvnytskyi
Sports venues in Kirovohrad Oblast